The academic undergraduate degree of Bachelor of Social Science (BSS, B.Soc.Sc., or B.Soc.Sci.) requires three to four years of study in the social sciences at an institution of higher education, primarily found in the Commonwealth of Nations.

It can be distinguished from other standard undergraduate degrees as the Bachelor of Social Science is only focused on theory, social statistics, quantitative and qualitative social research, the philosophy of social science and the scientific method.

Studies 

Disciplines and areas of study of the Bachelor of Social Science include Anthropology, Criminology, Economics, Environmental Planning, Geography, Community Development, History, Human Ecology, Human Services, International Development, Industrial Relations, Political Science, Psychology, Demography, Public Health, Public Policy, Sustainability, Statistics, and Sociology.

The Bachelor of Social Science can also be combined as a dual degree with a Bachelor of Arts, a Bachelor of Laws, a Bachelor of Education, a Bachelor of Social Work or a Bachelor of Economics. Studies and research can be advanced by an Honours degree and other postgraduate work.

References

social science methodology
Social Science